Ann Cathleen Bermingham (born May 1948) is an American art historian and educator. A specialist on eighteenth- and nineteenth-century British art, Bermingham is Professor of Art History Emeritus at the University of California, Santa Barbara.

Career
Bermingham graduated from Manhattanville College, where she received a Bachelor of Arts in 1969. She then earned a Master of Arts from the University of Massachusetts, Amherst and a Doctor of Philosophy from Harvard University in 1982. Bermingham wrote a doctoral dissertation on English landscape painting, focusing especially on the artists John Constable and Thomas Gainsborough. She is also a member of Phi Kappa Phi.

Bermingham has taught exclusively within the University of California system throughout her career, namely at Irvine, Los Angeles, Riverside, Santa Cruz, and Santa Barbara. She joined the latter in 1993, eventually becoming Professor of Art History Emeritus upon retirement.

Selected works
Landscape and Ideology: The English Rustic Tradition, 1740-1860, 1986  
The Consumption of Culture, 1600-1800: Image, Object, Text, 1995 
Learning to Draw: Studies in the Cultural History of a Polite and Useful Art, 2000 
Sensation and Sensibility: Viewing Gainsborough's Cottage Door, 2005

See also
List of Harvard University people
List of University of California, Santa Barbara faculty
List of University of Massachusetts Amherst alumni

References

External links
University of California profile

1948 births
Living people
American art historians
Women art historians
Manhattanville College alumni
University of Massachusetts Amherst alumni
Harvard University alumni
University of California, Santa Barbara faculty